Placid Hills is a rural/residential locality on the outskirts of the town of Gatton in the Lockyer Valley Region, Queensland, Australia.

History 
The locality was named and bounded by the Minister for Natural Resources on 18 February 2000.

Geography
Lockyer Creek forms much of the southern and eastern boundaries.

Road infrastructure
The Gatton Clifton Road (State Route 80) passes to the south.

References 

Lockyer Valley Region
Localities in Queensland